Ennittum is a Malayalam drama film directed by Renjilal Damodaran (aka Renjith Lal), starring Dinu Dennis and Kaniha in the lead roles.  The film tells the story of four college-going youngsters. The film's music is composed by Jassie Gift.

Cast
 Dinu Dennis as Prem Gopal
Kaniha as  Sneha
Swarnamalya as Sujee
Siddharth as Jith
Dinesh Prabhakar
Lalu Alex as Gopal
T.P. Madhavan
Shobha Mohan as Vaani Gopal
Devan
Manoj K. Jayan as Prof. Jayadevan
Cochin Haneefa as Prof. Vilasan
Salim Kumar as Fa.Perera Joseph
Nelson Sooranad as Drunker
Sreekala Sasidharan

Soundtrack
Music: Jassie Gift
"Pada" (Jassie Gift, Jyotsna)
"Orunoorashakal" (K.S. Chitra)
"Chellamanikattu" (Karthik)
"Swarnameghame" (Jyotsna, Vidhu Prathap)
"Orunoorashakal" (K.S. Chitra, Srinivas)
"Veedellam " (Hridya Suresh, Rajesh)

References

2006 films
2000s Malayalam-language films